Jarc is a surname. Notable people with the surname include:

Blaž Jarc (born 1988), Slovenian cyclist
Iztok Jarc (born 1963), Slovenian diplomat and politician
Miran Jarc (1900–1942), Slovenian writer, poet, playwright, and essayist